This is a list of selected islands that are part of Washington state.

See also

References

Washington State by Population and Area
Islands of Washington State by population and area
Washington State
Pacific Ocean-related lists